Hoàng Hà Giang (30 April 1991 – 7 December 2015) was a Vietnamese taekwondo practitioner who won a silver medal at the 2006 Asian Games.

In 2008, when just 17 years old and qualified for Beijing Olympic, she was diagnosed with SLE, which made her give up this competition and retire from professional taekwondo. In 2013, she was caught in a traffic accident that broke her leg. She died on 7 December 2015.

References

1991 births
2015 deaths
Asian Games medalists in taekwondo
Asian Games silver medalists for Vietnam
Competitors at the 2007 Southeast Asian Games
Medalists at the 2006 Asian Games
Southeast Asian Games bronze medalists for Vietnam
Southeast Asian Games medalists in taekwondo
Sportspeople from Ho Chi Minh City
Taekwondo practitioners at the 2006 Asian Games
Vietnamese female taekwondo practitioners
20th-century Vietnamese women
21st-century Vietnamese women